Evan Christopher Bradds (born April 19, 1994) is an American basketball coach. He played college basketball at Belmont University.

Bradds, the grandson of former Ohio State All-American and NBA player Gary Bradds, grew up in Jamestown, Ohio and starred at Greeneview High School. He chose Belmont for college, and was a regular rotation player as a freshman, earning Ohio Valley Conference (OVC) Freshman of the Week honors on four occasions. As a sophomore, Bradds entered the starting lineup for the Bruins, averaging 14.2 points and 7.2 rebounds per game and leading the nation in field goal percentage (.688). As a junior, Bradds was named the OVC Player of the Year. Bradds was also recognized as a third-team Academic All-American in 2016.

On November 3, 2017, Bradds joined the coaching staff of the Maine Red Claws.

In September 2021, he was promoted to assistant coach/player enhancement staff after spending two seasons as video assistant with the Boston Celtics.

In July 2022, he was hired by Utah Jazz as assistant coach under Will Hardy, new head coach of Utah Jazz. He will be serving as player development coach.

References

External links
Belmont Bruins bio

1994 births
Living people
American men's basketball players
Basketball coaches from Ohio
Basketball players from Ohio
Belmont Bruins men's basketball players
Maine Red Claws coaches
People from Jamestown, Ohio
Power forwards (basketball)